Luxembourg American Cemetery and Memorial is a Second World War American military war grave cemetery, located in Hamm, Luxembourg City, Luxembourg. It is administered by the American Battle Monuments Commission.

History
The cemetery was established on 29 December 1944 by the 609th Quartermaster Company of the U.S. Third Army while Allied Forces were containing the German Ardennes offensive in the winter of 1944/1945. General George S. Patton used the city of Luxembourg as headquarters.

Layout
The new headstones were cemented onto concrete beams that run for more than six miles under the lawn of the grave plots. The 5,076 headstones are set in nine plots of fine grass, lettered A to I. Separating the plots are two malls radiating from the memorial and two transverse paths.  Two flagpoles overlook the graves area. Situated between the two flagpoles lies the grave of General George S. Patton. Twenty-two sets of brothers rest side-by-side in adjacent graves. During the 1950s, the original wooden grave markers were replaced with headstones made of white Lasa marble.

Not far from the cemetery entrance stands the white stone chapel, set on a wide circular platform surrounded by woods. It is embellished with sculpture in bronze and stone, a stained-glass window with the insignia of the five major U.S. commands that operated in the region, and a mosaic ceiling.

Under a U.S.–Luxembourg treaty signed in 1951 the U.S. government was granted free use in perpetuity of the land covered by the cemetery.

Notable burials
 Private William D. McGee (1923–1945), Medal of Honor recipient
 George S. Patton (1885–1945), US general
 Sergeant Day G. Turner (1921–1945), Medal of Honor recipient

Gallery

See also

References

Further reading

External links
 American Battle Monuments Commission Luxembourg American Cemetery and Memorial
 Website with photos of the Luxembourg American Cemetery and information on some of the soldiers buried there
 

American Cemetery and Memorial
American Cemetery and Memorial
American Cemetery and Memorial
World War II memorials
American Battle Monuments Commission
American Cemetery and Memorial
World War II cemeteries